Kirkland Revels is a 1962 Gothic novel by Victoria Holt. Set in a 16th-century former abbey in Yorkshire, this melodrama deals with the life of a young unexpected bride.

See also
 Eleanor Hibbert
 Gothic fiction

References

Novels by Eleanor Hibbert
1962 British novels
British Gothic novels
Novels set in Yorkshire
William Collins, Sons books